Stasimon in Greek tragedy is a stationary song, composed of strophes and antistrophes and performed by the chorus in the orchestra ("place where the chorus dances").

Aristotle states in the Poetics (1452b23) that each choral song (or melos) of a tragedy is divided into two parts: the parodos and the stasimon. He defines the latter as "a choral song without anapaests or trochaics". This comment about the absence of anapest and trochee has been interpreted to mean that the music was not based on the usual “walking” meters, since the chorus sings the stasimon while remaining in the orchestra. After making its entrance singing the parodos, it does not usually leave the orchestra until the end of the play.

The Suda, an 11th-century Byzantine encyclopedia, attributes the establishment of the choral singing of a stasimon to the celebrated kitharode Arion of Hermione.

References

Ancient Greek songs
Doric Greek
Ancient Greek theatre

fr:Tragédie grecque#Structure et langue